The "C" sub-family of chemokine receptors contains only one member: XCR1, the receptor for XCL1 and XCL2 (or lymphotactin-1 and -2).

XCR1 is also known as GPR5.

Function 

The protein encoded by this gene is a chemokine receptor belonging to the G protein-coupled receptor superfamily. The family members are characterized by the presence of 7 transmembrane domains and numerous conserved amino acids. This receptor is most closely related to RBS11 and the MIP1-alpha/RANTES receptor. It transduces a signal by increasing the intracellular calcium ions level. The viral macrophage inflammatory protein-II is an antagonist of this receptor and blocks signaling. Two alternatively spliced transcript variants encoding the same protein have been found for this gene.

Cross-presenting dendritic cells (DCs) in the spleen develop into XCR1+ DCs in the small intestine, T cell zones of Peyer's patches, and T cell zones and sinuses of mesenteric lymph nodes. XCR1+ DCs specialize in cross-presentations of orally applied antigens. The integrin SIRPα is also a differentiating factor for the XCR1+ DCs. The development transcription factor Batf3 helps develop the differences between XCR1+ DCs and CD103+ CD11b- DCs.

XCL1 contributes to chemotaxis only in CD8+ murine cells, but not other DC types, B cells, T cells, or NK cells. Only some of these CD8+ murine cells expressed XCR1 receptors. NK cells release XCL1 along with IFN-γ and some other chemokines upon encountering certain bacteria such as Listeria or MCMV. XCR1+ and CD8+cells work together to cross-present antigen and communicate CD8+ activation. Cross presentation of XCR1+ CD8+ and XCR1+ CD8- cells was strongest, as is expected since they have XCR1 receptors. CD4+ and CD8+ may become outdated terms, since the activity of the cell appears to be primarily dependent upon the expression of XCR1, which will make a population far more similar than the expression of CD4 or CD8.

XCR1+ cells are dependent on the growth factor Ftl3 ligand and are nonexistent in Batf3- deficient mice. Also, XCR1+ DCs are related to CD103+CD11b- DCs.

XCL1 is expressed by medullary thymic epithelial T cells (mTECs) while XCR1 is expressed by thymic dendritic cells (tDCs). This communication helps with the destruction of cells that are not self-tolerant. When mice lose the ability to express XCL1, they are deficient in accumulation of tDCs and producing naturally occurring regulatory T cells (nT reg cells). The displaying of XCL1 by mTECs, tDC chemotaxis, and nT reg cell production are all decreased in mice that lack Aire, demonstrating it as an important regulator of XCL1 production.

Naive CD8+ T cells are prepared when tumors form by cross-presentation via XCR1+ DCs and as a result will require a lower threshold to respond to antigen. Memory CD8+ T lymphocytes (mCTLs) are activated first after infection and then are signaled by CXCR3, IL-12, and CXCL9 by other XCR1+ DCs. In order to make a powerful secondary infection response, cytokine and chemokine signaling between XCR1+ DCs and NK cells must occur.

References

External links

Further reading

External links 
 

Cytokines
Cell biology
Receptors
Integral membrane proteins